Pals of the Silver Sage is a 1940 American Western film directed by Albert Herman and written by Robert Emmett Tansey. The film stars Tex Ritter, Sugar Dawn, Slim Andrews, Clarene Curtis, Glenn Strange and Carleton Young. The film was released on April 22, 1940, by Monogram Pictures.

Plot
Tex gets a job on Sugar Gray's ranch. He soon discovers how the brand on her cattle have been changed to that of Vic Insley's, then he gets the brands switched back, while resisting attempts on his life. Now he must find a way to get the cattle to market.

Cast          
Tex Ritter as Tex Wright
Sugar Dawn as Sugar Grey
Slim Andrews as Cactus
Clarene Curtis	as Ruth Hill 
Glenn Strange as Vic Insley
Carleton Young as Jeff Grey
Joe McGuinn as Cowhide
Chester Gan as Ling
Warner Richmond as Sheriff

References

External links
 

1940 films
American Western (genre) films
1940 Western (genre) films
Monogram Pictures films
Films directed by Albert Herman
American black-and-white films
1940s English-language films
1940s American films